Eselborn is a small town in the commune of Clervaux, in northern Luxembourg.  , the town has a population of 492.

Clervaux
Towns in Luxembourg